The Loxton Football Club is an Australian rules football club which compete in the Riverland Football League.

History

The club was formed in 1908 and played their first game against Lyrup.

Throughout the 1920s the club maintained a presence in the local Loxton District Football Association.

In 1930 it was decided to field two teams in the local district competition, the Imperials and the Olympicians. It remained that way until the advent of WWII

Reforming after the war the club joined the Upper Murray Football Association and was an immediate success winning the first four premiers it competed in. The club was so strong it won 15 premierships in its first twenty years.

Premierships
1946, 1947, 1948, 1949, 1951, 1953, 1955, 1957, 1958, 1960, 1961, 1962, 1963, 1964, 1965, 1970, 1971, 1976, 1988, 1996, 2006

Notable players
 Russell Ebert - 
 Grantley Fielke - ,

Books
 Lines, P. The encyclopedia of South Australian Country Football Clubs. .

References

External links 
 Official AFL Website
 RFL League Website

Australian rules football clubs established in 1908
1908 establishments in Australia
Australian rules football clubs in South Australia